Arnold Dashefsky, born in 1942, is a professor at the University of Connecticut who has written several books on the topics relating to Jewish ethnicity, culture, ideologies, among others.

Dashefsky is currently director of the North American Jewish Data Bank.

One of Dashefsky's key theses is that Jewish identity is taken for granted in populations, such as Israel where Jews make up a majority of the population. Furthermore, he has asserted that the number of Jews in the United States is roughly the same as the number of Jews in Israel. Hence, he feels that Jewish identity should be no less strong in either nation.

Organizations 
 American Sociological Association
 Connecticut Academy of Arts and Sciences
 University of Connecticut Center for Judaic Studies and Contemporary Jewish Life (Director)

References

External links
 University of Connecticut, Dr. Arnold Dashefsky's Page
 Jewish Databank website administered by University of Connecticut's Center for Judaic Studies and Contemporary Jewish Life
 Thompson, Allison: "Sociologist Studies Jewish Identity in Israel, United States." Advance (on the web). 3 November 2003: 

Judaic studies
Living people
Jewish American scientists
American sociologists
Jewish sociologists
Jewish social scientists
1942 births
21st-century American Jews